McCaslin Nunatak is an isolated nunatak  south of the west end of the Bender Mountains, Antarctica. It was mapped by the United States Geological Survey (USGS) from ground surveys and U.S. Navy air photos, 1960–63, and was named by the Advisory Committee on Antarctic Names for James C. McCaslin, a member of the U.S. Army Aviation Unit which supported the USGS Topo East survey in 1962–63.

References

Nunataks of Marie Byrd Land